Samarinbreen is a glacier in Sørkapp Land at Spitsbergen, Svalbard. The glacier debouches into Samarinvågen, a southern bay of the fjord Hornsund. The glacier is named after Samarin, the name of a craftsman, fisherman and member of Arctic expeditions between 1899 and 1902.

References 

Glaciers of Spitsbergen